The Lucknow Police Commissionerate (Hindi: लखनऊ पुलिस आयुक्तालय) is the primary law enforcement agency for the city of Lucknow, the capital of Uttar Pradesh. It is a police unit of Uttar Pradesh Police and has the primary responsibilities of law enforcement and investigation in Lucknow district.

It is headed by the Commissioner of Police (CP), who is an IPS officer of ADGP rank, and is assisted by two Joint Commissioners of Police (JCP) who is of IG rank, and five Deputy Commissioners of Police (DCP) who are of SP rank.

Of the two Joint Commissioners, one looks after law and order, and the other looks after crime.

The current CP of Lucknow City is IPS SB Shirodkar.

History 
Before January 2020, Lucknow District Police came under Lucknow police zone and Lucknow police range of Uttar Pradesh Police. Lucknow zone is headed by an IPS officer in the rank of Additional director general of police (ADG), whereas Lucknow range is headed by an IPS officer in the rank of Inspector General of Police (IG).

Police Administration of Lucknow District was headed by the Senior Superintendent of Police (SSP) who was an IPS officer. He was assisted by seven Superintendents of Police (SP)/Additional Superintendents of Police (Addl. SP) (East, North, West, Rural area, Trans-Gomti, Protocol, Traffic and Crime). The district was divided into twelve police circles, each responsibility of a Circle Officer (CO) in the rank of Deputy Superintendent of Police.

On 13 January 2020, Chief Minister Yogi Adityanath's Cabinet passed the decision of making 2 police commissionerates in the state.
 First in the Lucknow, the capital and the largest city of the state.
 Second one in Gautam Buddha Nagar District.

Home Department of Uttar Pradesh appointed IPS Sujit Pandey as the first Police Commissioner of Lucknow.

Headquarters 
Currently, office of the Police Commissioner that serves as the headquarters of the police department has been given temporary space at the office of Forensic Science Laboratory in Mahanagar.

On 5 January 2022, chief minister Yogi Adityanath laid the foundation of a new Hi-tech police commissionerate office that will complete in the time duration of 2 years and will be located next to the DGP residence at Rana Pratap Marg in Dalibagh area of the city. After the completion of the construction, the headquarters will be shifted there.

Hierarchy 
Lucknow City Police Commissionerate is headed by an IPS officer of Additional Director General of Police (ADGP) rank, who is appointed by the Home Minister of Uttar Pradesh known as the Commissioner of Police.

Hierarchy is as follows (from high to low level):

Roles and Responsibilities 
Lucknow is the capital of the state and is the center of wide range of political, cultural, social and economic activities. The Lucknow Police has to play a number of roles so far maintenance of law and order is concerned. The department undertakes the following activities:
 Investigating crimes
 Controlling criminal activities
 Protection of citizens
 Control traffic problem

As Lucknow is the seat of the Uttar Pradesh Government, the Vidhan Bhawan and the Secretariat of Uttar Pradesh is situated here. For the security of both this important government building and offices there is an additional team of Lucknow Police headed by ADCP who looks after these buildings for law and order in surroundings.

Traffic control is very important, in order to avoid accidents and Lucknow police has taken several measures to control the traffic such as implementing Integrated Traffic Management System (ITMS) in the city.

Helplines 
Lucknow Police has Helpline numbers through which people can seek help without going to the police station in person. The various Helpline numbers of Lucknow City Police are as follows;
 Police Control Room- 112
 Fire- 101
 Ambulance- 108/102
 Women helpline- 1090
 Child helpline- 1098
 Citizen call centre- 155300
 Complain against Govt. Department- 1076
 Toll free number of Chief Minister- 0522-2239296, 2236167

Structure, Zones, Divisions and Police Stations

Structure 

The Commissionerate is headed by Commissioner of Police who is of ADG rank and assisted by two Joint Commissioner of Police (JCP) of IG rank and DIG rank.

There are currently 5 zones which all are headed by Deputy Commissioner of Police (DCP) and inside the zones there are total 13 divisions those who all are headed by the Assistant Commissioner of Police (ACP). 

There are currently total 50 police stations that comes under police commissionerate.

Zones, Divisions and Police Stations 
5 zones of Police Commissionerate- 

North Zone, East Zone, Central Zone, West Zone and South Zone. 

Inside these zones there are 13 divisions - 

Aliganj Division, Gazipur Division, Mahanagar Division, Cantt Division, Gomti Nagar Division, Hazaratganj Division, Alambagh Division, Krishnanagar Division, Chowk Division, Bazarkhala Division, Kaiserbagh Division, Mohanlalganj Division and Kakori Division. All 40 police stations lie inside these divisions.

North Zone

Aliganj Division 
(1)  Aliganj PS

(2) Mariyaon PS

(3) Jankipuram PS

Gazipur Division 
(1) Gazipur PS

(2) Gudamba PS

(3) Indira Nagar PS

Mahanagar Division 
(1) Mahanagar PS

(2) Hasanganj PS

(3) Vikasnagar PS

East Zone

Cantt Division 
(1) Cantt PS

(2) Ashiyana PS

(3) PGI PS

Gomti Nagar Division 
(1) Gomti Nagar PS

(2) Gomti Nagar Extension PS

Central Zone

Hazaratganj Division 
(1) Hazaratganj PS 

(2) Husainganj PS

(3) Gautampalli PS

(4) Women (Mahila) PS

Alambagh Division 
(1) Alambagh PS

(2) Manaknagar PS

Krishnanagar Division 
(1) Krishnanagar PS

(2) Sarojini Nagar PS

(3) Banthara PS

West Zone

Chowk Division 
(1) Chowk PS

(2) Wazirganj PS, 

(3) Thakurganj PS

Bazarkhala Division 
(1) Bazarkhala PS

(2) Saadatganj PS

(3) Talkatora PS

Kaisarbagh Division 
(1) Kaisarbagh PS

(2) Aminabad PS

(3) Naka PS

South Zone

Mohanlalganj Division 
(1) Mohanlalganj PS

(2) Nagaram PS

(3) Gosainganj PS

(4) Sushant Golf City PS

Kakori Division 
(1) Kakori PS

(2) Para PS

(3) Dubagga PS

Source:

Commissioners of Lucknow Police 

Police Commissioner of Lucknow is the chief of the police commissionerate. The police commissioner is appointed by the Department of Home and Confidential on the recommendation by the Establishment Board, which includes Minister of Home (Uttar Pradesh Government), Additional Chief Secretary and other senior bureaucrats. The post of police commissioners of Lucknow City along with Kanpur Nagar are considered as a very reputed, and that is reason why the one of the best police officers of the state are always given the responsibility to look after these two commissionerates.

The police commissioner is an Indian Police Service (IPS) officer of ADGP rank.

Special Agencies 
Lucknow City Police Commissionerate is currently having 5 special agencies under it for the welfare of citizens-

 Crime Branch
 Cyber Crime
 Women Crime and safety
 Moter Vehicle
 Anti Human Trafficking Unit

All these units are headed by Assistant Commissioner of Police (ACP).

Source:

Insignia

Gazetted Officers

Non-gazetted Officers

Online Presence 
Lucknow Police Commissionerate has an official handle on Twitter.

Lucknow Traffic Police 
Lucknow Traffic Police has the job of managing the flow of traffic in the city. It is the traffic police unit within the Lucknow Police.

See also 
 Uttar Pradesh Police
 Kanpur Nagar Police Commissionerate
 Gautam Buddha Nagar Police Commissionerate
 Varanasi Police Commissionerate

Notes

References 

Uttar Pradesh Police
Metropolitan law enforcement agencies of India
2020 establishments in Uttar Pradesh
Government agencies established in 2020
Law enforcement agencies of India